Dane Goulet, known professionally as Birdapres, is a rapper from Vancouver, British Columbia, Canada. He has been called "Vancouver's most underrated rapper," and has been praised for his thoughtful rhymes. In 2006, Exclaim!s Thomas Quinlan wrote that Birdapres' collaborative albums Alleged Legends and Nothing is Cool were "two of the best releases for Peanuts & Corn".

Discography

Collaborative
(with DJ RKV) As it Is (self-released, 1998)
(with DJ Moves of Hip Club Groove) Alleged Legends (Peanuts & Corn, 2001)
(with Mcenroe) Nothing is Cool (Peanuts & Corn, 2004)
(with DJ Brace) Raw (Nostomania, 2009)

Solo
Egocide (self-released, 1996)
Alumni (self-released, 1998)
Bird Reynolds (East Van, 2000)
Collectors Item (Legendary Entertainment, 2001)
Get It Done (Peanuts & Corn, 2006)
Catch an L (Marathon of Dope, 2011)

References

Canadian male rappers
Living people
Musicians from Vancouver
Indie rappers
Year of birth missing (living people)
20th-century Canadian rappers
21st-century Canadian rappers
20th-century Canadian male musicians
21st-century Canadian male musicians